Pamandzi is a commune in the French overseas department of Mayotte, in the Indian Ocean. The commune of Pamandzi is located on the small island of Petite-Terre (or Pamanzi), off the main island of Mayotte.

The Dzaoudzi Pamandzi International Airport is located in Pamandzi.

Climate
Pamandzi has a tropical savanna climate (Köppen climate classification Aw).

References

Populated places in Mayotte
Communes of Mayotte